Okropir known in Russia as Tsarevich Okropir Georgievich Gruzinsky, (June 24, 1795 – October 30, 1857) was a Georgian prince royal (batonishvili) of the Bagrationi Dynasty.

Biography
Okropir (aka "Chrysosthomus") was born in Telavi to Crown Prince George (the future king George XII of Georgia, reigned 1798-1800) and his second wife, Mariam. After his father’s death and Russian annexation of Georgia (1800), the royal family was forcibly removed from Georgia. In 1803, Queen Mariam was sent into confinement in Belogorod Monastery at Voronezh for having murdered the Russian general Lazarev who was commanded to convoy the king’s family to Russia. Okropir was carried away to St. Petersburg where he was enlisted into the Page Corps and commissioned, in 1812, as a lieutenant of the Chevalier Guard. He retired in 1816 and lived thereafter in St. Petersburg, being prohibited by the authorities from permanently settling in Georgia.

Within Russia, Okropir and his cousin Prince Dimitri, son of Yulon, were principal leaders of Georgian royalists; they held gatherings of Georgian students at Moscow and St. Petersburg, and tried to convince them that Georgia should be independent. Okropir clandestinely visited Tiflis in 1830, and helped to found a secret society with the aim of restoring an independent kingdom under the Bagrationi Dynasty. The society included many leading Georgian nobles and intellectuals, among them Elizbar Eristavi, Philadelphos Kiknadze, Solomon Dodashvili, Dmitri Kipiani, Giorgi Eristavi, Alexander Chavchavadze, Grigol Orbeliani, and Iase Palavandishvili who subsequently betrayed his numbers. On December 10, 1832, a few days before the planned coup, the conspirators were arrested. Okropir was exiled to Kostroma in 1833, but was soon pardoned and allowed to return to Moscow where he died in 1857.

Family

Prince Okropir was married to Countess Anna Pavlovna Kutaisova (1800-1868). Okropir fathered three sons and two daughters—Princes and Princesses Gruzinsky (i.e., "of Georgia") — who were granted by the Russian emperor the style of His/Her Serene Highness.

 Prince Giorgi (Georgy Okropirovich Gruzinsky; c. 1834 – 28 February 1886), who died unmarried.
 Princess Ana (Anna Okropirovna Gruzinskaya; c. 1834 – 18 June 1898), who was married firstly to Prince Alexander Bagration-Mukhransky (1823–1853), of the House of Mukhrani, and secondly to Alexander Albizzi. 
 Prince Pavle (Pavel Okropirovich Gruzinsky; 26 April 1835 – 12 February 1875), whose petition resulted in the imperial confirmation of the Gruzinsky coat of arms in 1886. He married in 1861 Princess Anastasia Nikolayevna Dolgorukova (1842–1881), by whom he had four sons and one daughter:
 Prince Giorgi (Georgy Pavlovich Gruzinsky; 16 May 1862 – 3 November 1916),
 Prince Konstantine (Konstantin Pavlovich Gruzinsky; 1871–1916),
 Prince Pavle (Pavel Pavlovich Gruzinsky; 1871–1884),
 Prince Dimitri (Dmitry Pavlovich Gruzinsky; c. 1873 – died in infancy),
 Princess Nino (Nina Pavlovna Gruzinskaya; born 1867). 
 Prince Irakli (Irakly Okropirovich Gruzinsky)
 Princess Praskovia (Praskovia Okropirovna Gruzinskaya), possibly an extramarital child.

Ancestry

Notes

References 
 Lang, David Marshall (1962), A Modern History of Georgia. London: Weidenfeld and Nicolson.
 Suny, Ronald Grigor (1994), The Making of the Georgian Nation: 2nd edition, Indiana University Press, .

1795 births
1857 deaths
Bagrationi dynasty of the Kingdom of Kartli-Kakheti
Georgian princes
18th-century people from Georgia (country)
19th-century people from Georgia (country)
19th-century military personnel from the Russian Empire